Ḍerāwālī is a cover term for the Saraiki dialects spoken by the Derawal people in the Derajat region of central Pakistan. In Dera Ismail Khan District, Derawali is the local name of the Thali dialect, whereas in Dera Ghazi Khan District, it refers to the Multani dialect. In both cases, the dialect in question is also referred to as Hindkī (which is not to be confused with the Hindko spoken up north).

References

External links 
 Specimen of Deri - Punjabi at You tube

Punjabi dialects
Derajat